Daniel C. Miller (born 1956, in Harrisburg, Pennsylvania) was the Harrisburg City Controller and was a member of the Harrisburg City Council. Both positions are elected at large. Miller is Harrisburg's first openly gay city councillor.

Biography
Miller is a long-time resident of Harrisburg and is the founding partner of a successful CPA firm in the city. He is a graduate of Central Dauphin High School and Harrisburg Area Community College. He has earned a BA in accounting from Elizabethtown College and an MBA in finance from the Pennsylvania State University. He has served on the community advisory board of WITF public television, as a volunteer with the Central PA Literacy Council, and a member of the Harrisburg City Business Revolving Loan Committee. He is a founder of the GLBT Business Association in Harrisburg, now known as the Central Pennsylvania Gay and Lesbian Chamber of Commerce.

See also
Mayor of Harrisburg, Pennsylvania

References

External links 
Office of the City Controller, City of Harrisburg
Friends of Dan Miller

Harrisburg City Council members
Comptrollers in the United States
Pennsylvania Democrats
Gay politicians
American LGBT city council members
Elizabethtown College alumni
Smeal College of Business alumni
1956 births
Living people
21st-century LGBT people